Jacob Joseph Arrieta (born March 6, 1986) is an American former professional baseball pitcher. He played in Major League Baseball (MLB) for the Baltimore Orioles, Chicago Cubs, Philadelphia Phillies, and San Diego Padres.

Arrieta played college baseball at Weatherford Junior College and at Texas Christian University (TCU). He was an All-American and was named Mountain West Conference Pitcher of the Year at TCU. The Orioles selected Arrieta in the fifth round of the 2007 MLB draft, and he signed a then record contract for a fifth round draft pick. He pitched for the United States national baseball team at the 2008 Summer Olympics, winning the bronze medal.

Arrieta made his big league debut for the Orioles in 2010, and after four seasons he was traded to the Cubs in 2013. In 2015, he led MLB in wins with 22, pitched a no-hitter, and won the 2015 National League Cy Young Award. In 2016, he was an NL All Star, threw his second no-hitter, received a Silver Slugger Award, and won a World Series with the Cubs.

Prior to the start of the 2018 season, Arrieta signed a three-year, $75 million contract with the Phillies. In August 2019, it was announced that he would have season-ending surgery to remove a bone spur in his pitching elbow. He returned to the starting rotation with the Phillies for the shortened 2020 season. In 2021, he returned to the Cubs, but was released partway through the season before signing with the San Diego Padres. Arrieta announced his retirement from professional baseball after the 2021 season.

Amateur career 

Arrieta was born in Farmington, Missouri, to Lou and Lynda Arrieta. They moved to Texas four months after Arrieta was born, and he grew up in Plano, Texas, where he attended Plano East Senior High School. He was 6–1 with a 1.61 ERA as a junior, and 5–4 with a 1.30 ERA as a senior. As a high school senior he was selected by the Cincinnati Reds in the 31st round of the 2004 draft, but instead he chose to attend college.

Arrieta attended Weatherford Junior College for his freshman year in 2005, posting a 6–2 win–loss record with a 3.43 ERA. Following his freshman year, he was selected by the Milwaukee Brewers in the 26th round of the 2005 Major League Baseball draft.

Instead, he opted to transfer to Texas Christian University (TCU), where he played for the TCU Horned Frogs baseball team for his sophomore and junior seasons, and studied sport psychology. During the summer of 2005, prior to enrolling at TCU, Arrieta participated in summer collegiate baseball with the McKinney Marshalls of the Texas Collegiate League, and posted a 4–3 record in 10 starts with a 1.87 ERA over  innings pitched. During his sophomore year in 2006, he led college baseball with 14 wins and had a 2.35 ERA over 19 appearances, and he had 111 strikeouts in 111 innings. He won the Mountain West Conference Pitcher of the Year Award and was named a Second-Team College Baseball All-American after his sophomore year.

In 2007, his junior year, he was 9–3 with a 3.01 ERA. He was named First-team All-Mountain West in 2007.

Arrieta first joined the United States national baseball team in 2006, and helped the team win the World University Baseball Championship in Cuba. He was 4–0 with 34 strikeouts and a 0.27 ERA—allowing just one earned run in 35 innings pitched over six starts for the team. In his first start at the 2008 Summer Olympics in Beijing, Arrieta pitched six innings and struck out seven in Team USA's 9–1 victory over the China national baseball team.

Professional career

Draft and minor leagues 

The Baltimore Orioles selected Arrieta in the fifth round, 159th overall, of the 2007 MLB Draft, and he joined the team on a signing bonus of $1.1 million, almost ten times higher than the recommended bonus for a fifth-round pick. Because he signed with the team late, he was not eligible to play for a regular-season Minor League Baseball (MiLB) team and made his professional debut in the Arizona Fall League (AFL), where he was named a Preseason All-Star. He made an impression there by pitching 16 scoreless innings for the Phoenix Desert Dogs, keeping his walks plus hits per innings pitched (WHIP) below 1.00 for the AFL championship-winning team.

He opened the 2008 season with the Class A Frederick Keys of the Carolina League. Minor league pitching coach Blaine Beatty remembered Arrieta entering the season with a strong pitching repertoire, but struggling with the mental aspect of the game, particularly with maintaining his composure under duress. He made 20 starts for the Keys, going 6–5 in the process. Additionally, Arrieta served as the Keys' opening day starter, received both Mid-Season and Post-Season All-Star honors, and pitched in the All-Star Futures Game. He pitched a scoreless inning at the Futures Game, allowing only one hit and striking out one. Arrieta was also the only minor league baseball player below Double-A to be named to the United States national baseball team for the 2008 Summer Olympics. He started in one game for the USA team, pitching six scoreless innings in a 9–1 group stage victory over China. Arrieta and the rest of Team USA ultimately took bronze in the Olympic tournament. Although he missed the final six weeks of the season due to the Olympics, Arrieta led the Carolina League with a 2.87 ERA, while his 120 strikeouts were fourth in the league. When he returned from Beijing, he was named the Carolina League Pitcher of the Year.

Arrieta received his first Orioles spring training invitation in 2009, although he was not expected to make his major league debut that season. During spring training, he kept a personal blog that criticized the Orioles' training facilities, as well as the physical abilities of multiple teammates. One Oriole discovered this blog and printed out excerpts that he displayed around the clubhouse; this discovery caused friction between Arrieta and the rest of the team. He opened the regular season with the Double-A Bowie Baysox, posting a 6–3 record with a 2.59 ERA in 11 starts before receiving a promotion to the Triple-A Norfolk Tides on June 12. Although he took the loss in his 2–0 club debut against the Indianapolis Indians, Arrieta pitched six solid innings for Norfolk, allowing only two hits and one solo home run. He made 17 starts for Norfolk that season, posting a 5–8 record and a 3.93 ERA while striking out 78 batters in  innings.

Baltimore Orioles (2010–2013)

Arrieta received another spring training invitation in 2010, but he was assigned to the Tides on March 25, as Baltimore already had a complete starting rotation, and the club was not interested in having him start as a long reliever. Difficulties from Baltimore's starting rotation, however, forced the team to begin calling up minor league pitchers by the end of May. Arrieta was one of the top choices to replace David Hernandez on May 25, but Chris Tillman received the promotion in his stead, as Tillman was already on the 40-man roster, which made a promotion logistically simpler. Arrieta received his chance shortly afterwards, replacing a struggling Brad Bergesen for a June 10 game against A. J. Burnett and the New York Yankees. Arrieta pitched for six innings in his debut, allowing three earned runs while striking out six to earn the win in Baltimore's 4–3 victory. When Buck Showalter took over as manager for the Orioles on August 3, Arrieta and the rest of the Baltimore rotation showed immediate improvement: after going 14–45 with a combined 5.50 ERA before Showalter, the rotation improved to 15–11 with a 3.23 ERA in the month after his hiring. On September 18, the Orioles decided to shut Arrieta down for the remainder of the season, both because a bone spur in his pitching elbow had led to triceps tightness in his last start and because he had pitched a career-high  innings between Norfolk and Baltimore. After going 6–2 with a 1.85 ERA in 12 minor-league games, Arrieta finished his rookie season 6–6 with a 4.66 ERA in 18 starts, having struck out 52 batters in  innings. After receiving a second medical opinion, he decided against an offseason surgery to remove the spur.

After securing his position in the Orioles' 2011 starting rotation, Arrieta made his season debut for the Orioles' home opener at Camden Yards on April 4. He allowed one earned run on six hits while striking out three in six innings of the Orioles' 5–1 victory over the Detroit Tigers. He began the season as one of Baltimore's best starters, leading the team with nine wins in 18 starts, but there was some concern over his health and command: his ERA was 4.90 in that same time frame, he rarely lasted beyond six innings, and he frequently walked batters. Additionally, by early July, the bone spur in his elbow had begun to bother him again. He walked at least one batter per game until July 20, when he threw a career-high 111 pitches in seven innings against the Boston Red Sox. The fibrous mass in his elbow continued to affect his command, however, to the point where he walked a career-high six batters in a game against the New York Yankees. Arrieta underwent a season-ending surgery to remove the mass on August 12, and he finished his sophomore season with a 10–8 record and 5.05 ERA in 22 starts.

When Jeremy Guthrie, who had been the Orioles' Opening Day starting pitcher the last three seasons, was traded to the Colorado Rockies, Arrieta was selected to pitch the first game of Baltimore's 2013 season. He earned the win in the Orioles' 5–2 victory over the Minnesota Twins, allowing only two hits and striking out four batters in seven innings. Arrieta was far less successful as the season progressed, going 3–9 with a 6.13 ERA in 18 starts. He briefly spent time in the bullpen in June, but on July 6, after allowing six runs in  innings of a 9–7 loss to the Los Angeles Angels, Arrieta was demoted to the Triple-A Norfolk Tides. Manager Buck Showalter told reporters, "I think our guys understand that carrying around 6.00 ERAs in the American League just don't cut it". After a minor-league start in which he allowed five earned runs in  innings against the Gwinnett Stripers, Arrieta acquired a sport psychologist to aid in the mental aspect of his pitching. His performance improved in kind: Arrieta had a 5.75 ERA in his first six starts for Norfolk and a 1.82 ERA in his last four. In 10 starts for Norfolk, including one complete game, Arrieta went 5–4 with a 4.02 ERA. He was promoted back to Baltimore on September 7, and he made six more major-league appearances to close out the season, all of which came in relief. In 24 appearances for Baltimore, 18 of which were starts, Arrieta went 3–9 with a 6.20 ERA, and he struck out 109 batters in  innings. He dressed for the 2012 American League Division Series but was not on the active roster and did not appear in a game. The Orioles lost the series to the New York Yankees and were eliminated from the postseason.

Arrieta outpitched both Brian Matusz and Steve Johnson during spring training to win back a position in the Orioles' 2013 Opening Day starting rotation. He struggled with pitch command through his first four starts of the season, during which he went 1–1 with a 6.63 ERA, as well as 16 walks in 19 innings. On April 22, the Orioles demoted Arrieta to Triple-A and promoted right-handed reliever Alex Burnett in his stead. He spent the remainder of his time with the organization bouncing between Baltimore and Norfolk. In five starts for Baltimore across three major-league stints, Arrieta was 1–2 with a 7.23 ERA. He also made nine appearances for Norfolk, all but one of which were starts, and went 5–3 with a 4.41 ERA there.

Chicago Cubs (2013–2017)

2013–2014 
On July 2, 2013, the Orioles traded Arrieta and fellow pitcher Pedro Strop to the Chicago Cubs in exchange for starting pitcher Scott Feldman and catcher Steve Clevenger. The trade was met with criticism from members of the Cubs clubhouse, who were displeased with the decision to trade away Feldman, whose season by that point had been stronger than that of Strop and Arrieta. Arrieta, meanwhile, was assigned to the Triple-A Iowa Cubs in order to reclaim the command that had eluded him in Baltimore. He was first called up to Chicago for a spot start in the second game of a doubleheader against the Milwaukee Brewers, but did not join the Cubs full-time until August 14, when he replaced a struggling Carlos Villanueva in the rotation. Manager Dale Sveum had planned to call up Arrieta for the final stretch of the season in order to find him work with pitching coach Chris Bosio; rather than moving Chris Rusin from the rotation as planned, Villanueva was moved to the bullpen to make room for the new pitcher. He went 4–2 in nine starts for his first season in Chicago, recording a 3.66 ERA and 37 strikeouts in  innings. Additionally, in Iowa, Arrieta posted a 2–2 record with a 3.56 ERA and 39 strikeouts in seven starts and  innings.

Although he was named to the Opening Day starting rotation, Arrieta missed the first month of the 2014 season with right shoulder tightness before he was activated on May 3. Once healthy, Arrieta showed an increased command of his slider and cut fastball, which made him more effective against right-handed batters. As a result, he went 4–0 in six starts during the month of June, and his 0.92 ERA was the lowest of any Cubs pitcher in June since Rick Reuschel in 1977. After losing two no-hitter bids earlier in the season against the Cincinnati Reds and Boston Red Sox, Arrieta posted his first major league complete game shutout on September 16. The Cubs defeated the Reds 7–0, while Arrieta took a no-hitter into the eighth inning before allowing a double to Brandon Phillips. It was the only hit he allowed that game, giving him the team's first one-hit shutout since Jon Lieber in 2001. Arrieta finished the season with a 10–5 record and 2.53 ERA in 25 starts, and he struck out 167 batters in  innings.

2015: Cy Young Award 
On July 12, 2015, Arrieta pitched a complete game victory over the Chicago White Sox at Wrigley Field, his second complete game of the season and the third of his major league career. On August 20, he became the first MLB pitcher to win 15 games in the 2015 season. Ten days later, Arrieta no-hit the Los Angeles Dodgers at Dodger Stadium for the 14th no-hitter in Cubs history. He struck out 12 batters, including all three batters he faced in both the first and ninth innings. Sandy Koufax had been the last pitcher to complete a no-hitter by striking out all three batters he faced in the ninth inning, doing so against the Cubs in his 1965 perfect game—a game also played at Dodger Stadium. Arrieta was named the NL Player of the Week for August 24–30 and NL Pitcher of the Month for August with a 6–0 and a 0.43 ERA and the no-hitter. The right-hander held opposing hitters to a .130 batting average and a .196 on-base percentage in August and struck out 43 batters while walking just 10.  On September 22, Arrieta won his 20th game of the season, throwing a three-hitter against the Brewers.  With 11 more strikeouts in that 4–0 Cubs victory at Wrigley, he was the first MLB pitcher to win 20 games this season and had his fourth complete game and third shutout of the season.

After the 2015 All-Star break, he gave up 9 earned runs during 15 starts over  innings for a 0.75 ERA, the lowest in MLB history in the second half. On October 5, he was again named NL Pitcher of the Month for his 4–0 September record with a 0.45 ERA.

For the season, Arrieta's 22–6 record and 1.77 ERA (second in the NL) made him only the fifth pitcher to win at least 22 games with no more than six losses and a sub-2.00 ERA since the earned run became an official stat in 1913. Arrieta's 2015 season has been widely compared to Bob Gibson's 1968 season in which Gibson won the National League MVP and Cy Young Awards after posting a live-ball era record 1.12 ERA. He led the majors in wins, complete games (4), and shutouts (3), and led the National League in hits per 9 innings pitched (5.895) and games started (33).  He also led the majors in lowest home runs per nine innings (0.39). His .786 win–loss percentage and his 0.865 walks plus hits per innings pitched were second in the NL.

Arrieta started the 2015 National League Wild Card Game. He pitched a complete-game shutout, striking out 11 batters and allowed only four hits to defeat the Pittsburgh Pirates 4–0. He became the first pitcher to post a postseason shutout while striking out at least 10 batters and walking zero. He is also the first pitcher to have more stolen bases than runs allowed in a postseason game when he stole second base in the top of the 7th inning. Arrieta was the pitcher of record in the Game 2 loss of the 2015 National League Championship Series to the New York Mets.

Arrieta won the NL Cy Young Award to become the first Cubs pitcher to do so since Greg Maddux in 1992.  He was the fifth Cubs winner overall, also joining Fergie Jenkins (1971), Bruce Sutter (1979) and Rick Sutcliffe (1984). He also came in sixth in the voting for 2015 NL Most Valuable Player Award.

2016: World Series championship 

On February 5, 2016, Arrieta and the Cubs agreed on a record arbitration deal worth $10.7 million 2016 salary, the largest one-year contract for a second-time arbitration eligible pitcher, topping David Price's $10.1 million salary in 2013.  The club chose him as the 2016 season Opening Day starting pitcher against the Angels on April 4.

On April 21, Arrieta pitched his second career no-hitter and the 15th no-hitter in Cubs history against the Cincinnati Reds in a 16–0 blowout win.  He walked four and struck out six. Arrieta, who at the time of the no-hitter had not recorded a loss in his previous 17 regular-season starts, became only the second MLB pitcher ever to go unbeaten in regular-season play between no-hitters, with the only other being Johnny Vander Meer, who threw consecutive no-hitters in 1938.  The Arizona Diamondbacks defeated Arrieta and the Cubs 3–2 on June 5, even with 12 strikeouts in his first five innings, stopping a 20-game regular season winning streak and giving him his first loss in 11 months.

In 2016, he was 18–8 with a 3.10 ERA (10th in the NL) in  innings.  He led the league for the second consecutive year with 6.294 hits per 9 innings pitched, his 18 wins were third in the league, his .692 win–loss percentage was sixth, his 1.084 walks plus hits per innings pitched and 0.730 home runs per 9 innings pitched were seventh, his 190 strikeouts and  innings pitched were eighth, and his 8.666 strikeouts per 9 innings pitched were tenth. He won a Silver Slugger Award after batting .262/.304/.415 with 2 home runs and 7 RBIs in 65 at bats, and came in ninth in voting for the 2016 NL Cy Young Award.

In Game 3 of the 2016 NLDS, Arrieta hit a three-run home run off of San Francisco Giants' pitcher Madison Bumgarner, the first time that a pitcher hit a home run off Bumgarner, which ended Bumgarner's consecutive playoff scoreless innings streak of over 24 innings. Arrieta won Game 2 and Game 6 of the 2016 World Series. The Cubs won Game 7 of the series 8–7 in 10 innings, giving them their first World Series title after a 108-year drought.

2017

On January 13, 2017, he agreed to a contract for the 2017 baseball season. He was NL Pitcher of the Month in August.

In 2017, Arrieta made 30 starts with a 14–10 record and a 3.53 ERA (eighth in the National League) in  innings. He threw 14 wild pitches, tied for most in the National League, his 10 hit by pitch were 5th in the NL, and his 8.020 hits per 9 innings pitched and 1.218 walks plus hits per 9 innings pitched were tenth in the league. The Cubs finished the season 92–70 and clinched another NL Central division title.

Arrieta started Game four of the 2017 NLDS and, after 90 pitches, left in the fourth inning trailing 1–0. The Cubs and Arrieta lost that game to the Washington Nationals but won Game Five and moved on to the 2017 NLCS. After three losses and facing elimination, Arrieta was the starter and winning pitcher in a Game Four victory against the Dodgers. After the Cubs season ended in a Game Five loss to the Dodgers, he declined the Cubs' $17.4 million qualifying offer and became a free agent for the first time in his career.

Philadelphia Phillies (2018–2020) 

On March 11, 2018, shortly before opening day, the Philadelphia Phillies signed Arrieta to a three-year, $70 million contract with additional options of up to $135 million over five years. The late signing prevented Arrieta from being named to the opening day 25-man roster, as he required additional training time with the Class A-Advanced Clearwater Threshers, but he opened the season shortly afterwards with a start against the Miami Marlins on April 8. Despite a career-low 6.2 strikeouts per nine innings (K/9), down from his 9.3 high in 2015, Arrieta posted an ERA of 0.90 in May 2018 by generating weak contact ground balls for easy outs. This strategy was short-lived: the following month, Arrieta went 0–4 with a 6.66 ERA, telling reporters, "The ball is getting hit. That's it. Making mistakes, too many mistakes, especially against an aggressive, a good lineup." After one game in which the Phillies lost 6–1 to the San Francisco Giants, Arrieta criticized his teammates for their poor defense, especially on infield shifts. He targeted Scott Kingery in particular for not moving quickly enough on the ball that ultimately set up Andrew McCutchen for a three-run home run. Arrieta was also frustrated with himself as the season went on, mostly because he could not explain why his pitching suddenly faltered. He finished the season 10–11 with a 3.96 ERA in 31 starts, with 138 strikeouts in  innings.

Following the 2018 season, Arrieta revealed that he had injured his knee in June, and that he had chosen to pitch through the pain, hiding the injury from his teammates and from manager Gabe Kapler. After re-injuring his knee during an offseason workout, Arrieta discovered that he had suffered a meniscus tear, and he underwent surgery in January to repair the joint. Believing himself healthy and with an improved arm angle while pitching leading into the 2019 MLB season, Arrieta captured his 100th career win on April 12, pitching seven innings of the Phillies' 9–1 rout of the Miami Marlins. By July 7, however, Arrieta seemed mired in a slump, with a 6.63 ERA through his last seven starts. On August 17, Arrieta and the Phillies announced that the pitcher would undergo a season-ending surgery to remove a bone spur in his pitching elbow. The spur had been causing pain over Arrieta's last seven starts of the year, limiting him to fewer than six innings per outing. By the time his season ended, Arrieta was 8–8 with a 4.64 ERA in 24 starts for the Phillies, and he struck out 110 batters in  innings.

Entering spring training in 2020, Arrieta declared himself "100 percent healthy" and was confident that he would be able to perform during the regular season. The COVID-19 pandemic, which shortened the 2020 MLB season to only 60 regular-season games, proved an added challenge for Arrieta, who was entering the final year of his contract with the Phillies. Rather than having 30 starts to prove himself to the free market crowd as expected, the shortened schedule meant that starters like Arrieta would only expect to see around 10 games of action. He opened the season as the Phillies' No. 3 starter, behind Nola and recent acquisition Zack Wheeler. Two positive COVID-19 tests in the Phillies clubhouse shut the team down for one week, and Arrieta did not receive his first start of the season until August 3, his first MLB appearance in nearly one year. He allowed three runs in five innings of a 6–3 loss to the New York Yankees. Arrieta remained healthy until September 15, when he was shut down for the season with a hamstring injury. In nine starts for the Phillies, he posted a 4–4 record and a 5.08 ERA. Philadelphia chose not to extend his contract at the end of the season, leaving him a free agent.

Return to Chicago (2021) 
On February 17, 2021, Arrieta rejoined the Cubs on a one-year, $4 million contract. After spending spring training tweaking his pitching delivery, Arrieta opened the season as Chicago's No. 2 starter, behind Kyle Hendricks. Arrieta's return to the Cubs was marred by injury. First, he suffered a cut on his right thumb on April 30 during a game against the Cincinnati Reds; after giving up seven runs in  innings, Arrieta was removed from the game and was placed on the 10-day injured list. On June 4, he attempted to play through a bout of gastroenteritis and proceeded to allow six runs in two innings of an 8–5 loss to the San Francisco Giants. As the season progressed, Cubs management began to voice concerns about Arrieta's pitch command and durability: not once in his first 13 starts of the year did he remain on the mound past the fifth inning. On July 5, Arrieta faced the Phillies for the first time since leaving the team. He threw only 55 pitches across  innings, allowing seven runs in the process, including a first-inning grand slam to outfielder Andrew McCutchen. The Cubs unconditionally released Arrieta on August 12, the day after he allowed seven runs on eight hits in one inning against the Milwaukee Brewers. He posted a 5–11 record with a 6.88 ERA during his second stint with the Cubs.

San Diego Padres (2021)
Four days after his release from the Cubs, Arrieta signed a minor league contract with the San Diego Padres, whose starting rotation had been depleted by injuries to Chris Paddack and Yu Darvish. He made his first start for the team on August 18, allowing five earned runs in  innings before departing with a hamstring injury. The injury caused Arrieta to miss 10 games on the injured list; three starts later, on September 19, he departed a game against the St. Louis Cardinals in the first inning with a right adductor magnus muscle strain. He faced only six batters and allowed five runs on two hits and a walk. Arrieta was designated for assignment on September 21. In only four starts for the Padres, he recorded a 10.95 ERA, allowing 15 earned runs in  innings. He was released the following day.

Retirement 
On April 18, 2022, Arrieta announced his retirement from professional baseball on the Barstool Sports podcast Pardon My Take, saying, "I haven't signed the papers, but I'm done ... At some point, the uniform goes to somebody else, and it's just my time." He finished his career with a 115–93 record and a 3.98 ERA in 285 games, all but six of which were starts, across 12 seasons. Arrieta struck out 1,433 batters while walking 571 and allowing 713 earned runs in  career innings pitched.

Pitching style 
During his MLB career, Arrieta threw five different kinds of pitches: a four-seam fastball, a sinker, a changeup, a slider, and a curveball. During 2015 and 2016, his two most dominant seasons, Arrieta's most effective pitch was a cross between a slider and a cut fastball. He described the pitch as taking on more of a cutter shape towards right-handed batters while leaning towards a slider for left-handed opponents. The hybrid pitch proved effective in inducing strikeouts: in the first three weeks of the 2016 season, Arrieta struck out 17 batters in 80 at bats where his last pitch was the slider/cutter. To combat this decreased velocity, Arrieta increased his use of breaking balls to confuse hitters while also relying on a sinking fastball to keep pitches low to the ground and playable for fielders.

Personal life 
Arrieta and his wife, gymnast Brittany Arrieta, have known each other since elementary school, and they began dating during their junior year of high school. They have two children together: a son, Cooper, and a daughter, Palmer. The family lives in Austin, Texas, where they are frequent hikers. Arrieta took up Pilates in 2013 and began incorporating it into his everyday workouts when he saw an improvement in his pitching.

Politically, Arrieta does not identify with either the Democratic or Republican political parties, and he did not vote in the 2016 United States presidential election. When the Cubs visited the White House to meet with then-President of the United States Barack Obama after their World Series victory in 2016, Arrieta clarified that his absence was not for political reasons, but due to the needs of his family. In 2021, Arrieta voiced his skepticism towards the COVID-19 vaccine, referencing the fact that several members of the New York Yankees tested positive for the virus despite being vaccinated. That May, he told reporters that he doubted the need to vaccinate as long as other COVID-19 safety guidelines were being followed.

Outside of baseball, Arrieta has made multiple television appearances. In the "Baseball" episode of the HBO comedy series Veep, protagonist Selina Meyer meets several members of the Orioles, including Arrieta and teammate Tommy Hunter. In 2017, Arrieta and Cubs teammate Kris Bryant appeared in an episode of Chicago Fire that focuses on a young Cubs fan injured in a car accident.

Accomplishments and awards

See also

 Chicago Cubs award winners and league leaders
 List of Chicago Cubs no-hitters
 List of Major League Baseball annual shutout leaders
 List of Major League Baseball no-hitters
 List of Olympic medalists in baseball
 List of Texas Christian University alumni
 List of World Series starting pitchers

References

External links

Jake Arrieta at SABR (Baseball BioProject)
Jake Arrieta at Baseball Almanac

1986 births
American sportspeople of Puerto Rican descent
Baltimore Orioles players
Barstool Sports people
Baseball players at the 2008 Summer Olympics
Baseball players from Missouri
Baseball players from Texas
Bowie Baysox players
Chicago Cubs players
Cy Young Award winners
Daytona Cubs players
Frederick Keys players
Iowa Cubs players
Living people
Medalists at the 2008 Summer Olympics
National League wins champions
Norfolk Tides players
Olympic bronze medalists for the United States in baseball
People from St. Louis
Philadelphia Phillies players
Phoenix Desert Dogs players
Plano East Senior High School alumni
San Diego Padres players
Silver Slugger Award winners
Sportspeople from Plano, Texas
TCU Horned Frogs baseball players
Tennessee Smokies players
Weatherford Coyotes baseball players